The Women competition at the IBSF World Championships 2023 was held on 26 and 27 January 2023.

Results
The first two runs were started on 26 January at 13:30 and the last two runs on 27 January at 13:30.

References

Women Skeleton